University Presbyterian Church is a  historic Presbyterian church complex located in the University Heights neighborhood of Buffalo, Erie County, New York. It has an unusual trapezoidal-shaped plan formed by the V-shaped orientation of the original sanctuary wing (1928) and the later education wing addition (1956).  The buildings are Colonial Revival style, red brick structures of the Wren-Gibbs tradition.  The front facade features a two-story tetra-style pedimented portico with wood Doric order columns and a tall, Wren-Gibbs inspired tower and steeple.

It was listed on the National Register of Historic Places in 2015.

References

External links
church website

Presbyterian churches in New York (state)
Churches on the National Register of Historic Places in New York (state)
Colonial Revival architecture in New York (state)
Churches completed in 1928
Churches in Buffalo, New York
National Register of Historic Places in Buffalo, New York